Crosbyella is a genus of armoured harvestmen in the family Phalangodidae. There are about five described species in Crosbyella.

Species
These five species belong to the genus Crosbyella:
 Crosbyella distincta C.J. Goodnight & M.L. Goodnight, 1942
 Crosbyella montana C.J. Goodnight & M.L. Goodnight, 1942
 Crosbyella roeweri C.J. Goodnight & M.L. Goodnight, 1942
 Crosbyella spinturnix (Crosby & Bishop, 1924)
 Crosbyella tuberculata C.J. Goodnight & M.L. Goodnight, 1942

References

Further reading

 
 
 
 
 

Harvestmen
Articles created by Qbugbot